is a Japanese football player who plays for Tokyo Verdy.

Club career statistics
Updated to 19 July 2022.

References

External links
Profile at Giravanz Kitakyushu

Profile at Kyoto Sanga

1989 births
Living people
Association football people from Chiba Prefecture
Japanese footballers
J1 League players
J2 League players
Kyoto Sanga FC players
Kataller Toyama players
Thespakusatsu Gunma players
Giravanz Kitakyushu players
Association football midfielders